The Vale of Glamorgan Council is the governing body for the Vale of Glamorgan, one of the Principal Areas of Wales. It was run by the Conservative Party after the 2008 United Kingdom local elections, taking over the council from no overall control.  Following the 2012 elections, it reverted to no overall control, and remained as such following the 2017 and 2022 elections.

History
The new Vale of Glamorgan Council unitary authority came into effect on 1 April 1996, following the dissolution of South Glamorgan. It replaced the Vale of Glamorgan Borough Council, which had been created in 1974 as a second-tier authority to South Glamorgan County Council.

Political control
The first election to the reconstituted council was held in 1995, initially operating as a shadow authority alongside the outgoing authorities until it came into its powers on 1 April 1996. Political control of the council since 1996 has been held by the following parties:

Leadership
The leaders of the council since 1999 have been:

Current composition
As at 5 May 2022:

Elections
Since 2012, elections have taken place every five years. The last election was 5 May 2022.

Party with the most elected councillors in bold. Coalition agreements in notes column.

Premises
The council is based at the Civic Offices on Holton Road in Barry, which were built in 1981 for the old Vale of Glamorgan Borough Council.

Electoral divisions

Until 2022 the county borough was divided into 23 electoral wards returning 47 councillors. Some of these wards are coterminous with communities (parishes) of the same name. Other wards may encompass several communities and in some cases communities can encompass more than one ward. The following table lists council wards, communities and associated geographical areas prior to the 2022 boundary changes. Communities with a community council are indicated with a '*':

In the news
In 2010 it was revealed that the chief executive of the Vale of Glamorgan Council was the fourth highest paid in Wales, at £160,000 and £170,000 per annum. This was more than the salary of the Prime Minister of The United Kingdom and the First Minister of Wales. The Vale of Glamorgan Council released in a press statement that, "The salary is on a par with other council chief executives".

References

External links
Vale of Glamorgan council

Politics of the Vale of Glamorgan
Vale of Glamorgan
Organisations based in the Vale of Glamorgan
1996 establishments in Wales